The 1981–82 Dallas Mavericks season was the second season of the franchise in the National Basketball Association (NBA). Rookie Jay Vincent  led the team in scoring with 21.4 points per game and earned NBA All-Rookie Team honors. The Mavericks improved to 28–54, getting out of the Midwest Division cellar as they finished above the Utah Jazz.

Draft picks

The 1981 NBA Draft brought three players who would become vital parts of the team. The Mavs selected 6'6" forward Mark Aguirre with the first pick, 6'6" guard Rolando Blackman 9th, and 6'7" forward Jay Vincent 24th. By the end of his seven-year Mavs career, Aguirre would average 24.6 points per game. Blackman contributed 19.2 points over his 11-year career in Dallas.

Roster

Regular season

Season standings

Record vs. opponents

Game log

Player statistics

Awards and records

Awards
 Jay Vincent, NBA All-Rookie Team 1st Team

Records

Transactions

Trades

Free Agents

Additions

Subtractions

See also
 1981–82 NBA season

References

Dallas Mavericks seasons
Dal
Dallas
Dallas